is a Japanese actress. She appeared in more than 30 films since 1977.

Selected filmography

External links 

 

1952 births
Living people
Japanese film actresses